A bird strike (sometimes called birdstrike, bird ingestion (for an engine), bird hit, or bird aircraft strike hazard (BASH)) is a collision between an airborne animal (usually a bird or bat) and a moving vehicle, usually an aircraft. The term is also used for bird deaths resulting from collisions with structures such as power lines, towers and wind turbines (see Bird–skyscraper collisions and Towerkill).

A significant threat to flight safety, bird strikes have caused a number of accidents with human casualties. There are over 13,000 bird strikes annually in the US alone. However, the number of major accidents involving civil aircraft is quite low and it has been estimated that there is only about 1 accident resulting in human death in one billion (109) flying hours. The majority of bird strikes (65%) cause little damage to the aircraft; however, the collision is usually fatal to the bird(s) involved.

The Canada goose has been ranked as the third most hazardous wildlife species to aircraft (behind deer and vultures), with approximately 240 goose-aircraft collisions in the United States each year. 80% of all bird strikes go unreported.

Most accidents occur when a bird (or birds) collides with the windscreen or is sucked into the engine of jet aircraft. These cause annual damages that have been estimated at $400 million within the United States alone and up to $1.2 billion to commercial aircraft worldwide. In addition to property damage, collisions between man-made structures and conveyances and birds is a contributing factor, among many others, to the worldwide decline of many avian species.

The International Civil Aviation Organization (ICAO) received 65,139 bird strike reports for 2011–14, and the Federal Aviation Administration counted 177,269 wildlife strike reports on civil aircraft between 1990 and 2015, growing 38% in seven years from 2009 to 2015. Birds accounted for 97%.

Event description

Bird strikes happen most often during takeoff or landing, or during low altitude flight. The majority of bird collisions occur near or at airports (90%, according to the ICAO) during takeoff, landing and associated phases.

The point of impact is usually any forward-facing edge of the vehicle such as a wing leading edge, nose cone, jet engine cowling or engine inlet.

Jet engine ingestion is extremely serious due to the rotation speed of the engine fan and engine design. As the bird strikes a fan blade, that blade can be displaced into another blade and so forth, causing a cascading failure. Jet engines are particularly vulnerable during the takeoff phase when the engine is turning at a very high speed and the plane is at a low altitude where birds are more commonly found.

The force of the impact on an aircraft depends on the weight of the animal and the speed difference and direction at the point of impact. The energy of the impact increases with the square of the speed difference. High-speed impacts, as with jet aircraft, can cause considerable damage and even catastrophic failure to the vehicle. However, according to the FAA only 15% of strikes (ICAO 11%) actually result in damage to the aircraft.

Bird strikes can damage vehicle components, or injure passengers. Flocks of birds are especially dangerous and can lead to multiple strikes, with corresponding damage. Depending on the damage, aircraft at low altitudes or during take-off and landing often cannot recover in time. US Airways Flight 1549 is a classic example of this. The engines on the Airbus A320 used on that flight were torn apart by multiple bird strikes at low altitude. There was no time to make a safe landing at an airport, forcing a water landing in the Hudson River.

Remains of the bird, termed snarge, are sent to identification centers where forensic techniques may be used to identify the species involved. These samples need to be taken carefully by trained personnel to ensure proper analysis and reduce the risks of infection (zoonoses).

Species
Most bird strikes involve large birds with big populations, particularly geese and gulls in the United States. In parts of the US, Canada geese and migratory snow geese populations have risen significantly while feral Canada geese and greylag geese have increased in parts of Europe, increasing the risk of these large birds to aircraft. In other parts of the world, large birds of prey such as Gyps vultures and Milvus kites are often involved. In the US, reported strikes are mainly from waterfowl (30%), gulls (22%), raptors (20%), and pigeons and doves (7%). The Smithsonian Institution's Feather Identification Laboratory has identified turkey vultures as the most damaging birds, followed by Canada geese and white pelicans, all of which are very large birds. In terms of frequency, the laboratory most commonly finds mourning doves and horned larks involved in the strike.

The largest numbers of strikes happen during the spring and fall migrations. Bird strikes above  altitude are about 7 times more common at night than during the day during the bird migration season.

Large land animals, such as deer, can also be a problem to aircraft during takeoff and landing. Between 1990 and 2013, civil aircraft experienced more than 1,000 collisions with deer and 440 with coyotes.

An animal hazard reported from London Stansted Airport in England is rabbits: they get run over by ground vehicles and planes, and they pass large amounts of droppings, which attract mice, which in turn attract owls, which then become another birdstrike hazard.

Countermeasures
There are three approaches to reduce the effect of bird strikes. The vehicles can be designed to be more bird resistant, the birds can be moved out of the way of the vehicle, or the vehicle can be moved out of the way of the birds.

Vehicle design
The engine does not have to survive the ingestion, just be safely shut down. This is a 'stand-alone' requirement, i.e., the engine, not the aircraft, must pass the test. Multiple strikes (from hitting a bird flock) on twin-engine jet aircraft are very serious events because they can disable multiple aircraft systems, requiring emergency action to land the aircraft, as in the January 15, 2009 forced ditching of US Airways Flight 1549.

As required by EASA's CS 25.631 or FAA's 14 CFR § 25.571(e)(1) post Amdt 25-96, modern jet aircraft structures are designed for continued safe flight and landing after withstanding one  bird impact anywhere on the aircraft (including the flight deck windshields). Per FAA's 14 CFR § 25.631, they must also withstand one  bird impact anywhere on the empennage (tail). Flight deck windows on jet aircraft must be able to withstand one  bird collision without yielding or spalling. For the empennage (tail), this is usually accomplished by designing redundant structures and protected locations for control system elements or protective devices such as splitter plates or energy-absorbing material. Often, one aircraft manufacturer will use similar protective design features for all of its aircraft models, to minimize testing and certification costs.

At first, bird strike testing by manufacturers involved firing a bird carcass from a gas cannon and sabot system into the tested unit. The carcass was soon replaced with suitable density blocks, often gelatin, to ease testing. Current certification efforts are mainly conducted with limited testing, supported by more detailed analysis using computer simulation, although final testing usually involves some physical experiments (see birdstrike simulator).

Based on US NTSB recommendation following the 2009 US Airways Flight 1549, the EASA in 2017, followed a year after by the FAA, proposed that engines should sustain a bird strike not only on takeoff and climb where turbofans are turning at their fastest, but also in descent when they turn more slowly; new regulations could apply for the Boeing NMA engines.

Wildlife management

Though there are many methods available to wildlife managers at airports, no single method will work in all instances and with all species. Wildlife management in the airport environment can be grouped into two broad categories: non-lethal and lethal. Integration of multiple non-lethal methods with lethal methods results in the most effective airfield wildlife management strategy.

Non-lethal
Non-lethal management can be further broken down into habitat manipulation, exclusion, visual, auditory, tactile, or chemical repellents, and relocation.

Habitat manipulation
One of the primary reasons that wildlife is seen in airports is an abundance of food. Food resources on airports can be either removed or made less desirable. One of the most abundant food resources found on airports is turfgrass. This grass is planted to reduce runoff, control erosion, absorb jet wash, allow passage of emergency vehicles, and to be aesthetically pleasing (DeVault et al. 2013) However, turfgrass is a preferred food source for species of birds that pose a serious risk to aircraft, chiefly the Canada goose (Branta canadensis). Turfgrass planted at airports should be a species that geese do not prefer (e.g. St. Augustine grass) and should be managed in such a way that reduces its attractiveness to other wildlife such as small rodents and raptors (Commander, Naval Installations Command 2010, DeVault et al. 2013). It has been recommended that turfgrass be maintained at a height of 7–14 inches through regular mowing and fertilization (U.S. Air Force 2004).

Wetlands are another major attractant of wildlife in the airport environment. They are of particular concern because they attract waterfowl which have a high potential to damage aircraft (Federal Aviation Administration 2013). With large areas of impervious surfaces, airports must employ methods to collect runoff and reduce its flow velocity. These best management practices often involve temporarily ponding runoff. Short of redesigning existing runoff control systems to include non-accessible water such as subsurface flow wetlands (DeVault et al. 2013), frequent drawdowns and covering of exposed water with floating covers and wire grids should be employed (International Civil Aviation Organization 1991). The implementation of covers and wire grids must not hinder emergency services.

Exclusion
Though excluding birds from the entire airport environment is virtually impossible, it is possible to exclude deer and other mammals that constitute a small percentage of wildlife strikes. Three-meter high fences made of chain link or woven wire, with barbed wire outriggers, are the most effective. When used as a perimeter fence, these fences also serve to keep unauthorized people off of the airport (Seamans 2001). Realistically every fence must have gates. Gates that are left open allow deer and other mammals onto the airport. 4.6 meter long cattle guards have been shown to be effective at deterring deer up to 98% of the time (Belant et al. 1998).

Hangars with open superstructures often attract birds to nest and roost in. Hangar doors are often left open to increase ventilation, especially in the evenings. Birds in hangars are in proximity to the airfield and their droppings are both a health and damage concern. Netting is often deployed across the superstructure of a hangar denying access to the rafters where the birds roost and nest while still allowing the hangar doors to remain open for ventilation and aircraft movements. Strip curtains and door netting may also be used but are subject to improper use (e.g. tying the strips to the side of the door) by those working in the hangar. (U.S. Air Force 2004, Commander, Naval Installations Command 2010).

Visual repellents
There have been a variety of visual repellent and harassment techniques used in airport wildlife management. They include using birds of prey and dogs, effigies, landing lights, and lasers. Birds of prey have been used with great effectiveness at landfills where there were large populations of feeding gulls (Cook et al. 2008). Dogs have also been used with success as visual deterrents and means of harassment for birds at airfields (DeVault et al. 2013). However, airport wildlife managers must consider the risk of knowingly releasing animals in the airport environment. Both birds of prey and dogs must be monitored by a handler when deployed and must be cared for, when not deployed. Airport wildlife managers must consider the economics of these methods (Seamans 2001).

Effigies of both predators and conspecifics have been used with success to disperse gulls and vultures. The effigies of conspecifics are often placed in unnatural positions where they can freely move with the wind. Effigies have been found to be the most effective in situations where the nuisance birds have other options (e.g. other forage, loafing, and roosting areas) available. Time to habituation varies. (Seamans et al. 2007, DeVault et al. 2013).

Lasers have been used with success to disperse several species of birds. However, lasers are species-specific as certain species will only react to certain wavelengths. Lasers become more effective as ambient light levels decrease, thereby limiting effectiveness during daylight hours. Some species show a very short time to habituation (Airport Cooperative Research Program, 2011). The risks of lasers to aircrews must be evaluated when determining whether or not to deploy lasers on airfields. Southampton Airport utilizes a laser device which disables the laser past a certain elevation, eliminating the risk of the beam being shone directly at aircraft and air traffic control tower (Southampton Airport 2014).

Auditory repellents
Auditory repellents are commonly used in both agricultural and aviation contexts. Devices such as propane exploders (cannons), pyrotechnics, and bioacoustics are frequently deployed on airports. Propane exploders are capable of creating noises of approximately 130 decibels (Wildlife Control Supplies). They can be programmed to fire at designated intervals, can be remote controlled, or motion activated. Due to their stationary and often predictable nature, wildlife quickly becomes habituated to propane cannons. Lethal control may be used to extend the effectiveness of propane exploders (Washburn et al. 2006).

Pyrotechnics utilizing either an exploding shell or a screamer can effectively scare birds away from runways. They are commonly launched from a 12 gauge shotgun or a flare pistol, or from a wireless specialized launcher and as such, can be aimed to allow control personnel to "steer" the species that is being harassed. Birds show varying degrees of habituation to pyrotechnics. Studies have shown that lethal reinforcement of pyrotechnic harassment has extended its usefulness (Baxter and Allen 2008). Screamer type cartridges are still intact at the end of their flight (as opposed to exploding shells that destroy themselves) constituting a foreign object damage hazard and must be picked up. The use of pyrotechnics is considered "take" by the U.S. Fish and Wildlife Service (USFWS) and USFWS must be consulted if federally threatened or endangered species could be affected. Pyrotechnics are a potential fire hazard and must be deployed judiciously in dry conditions (Commander, Naval Installations Command, 2010, Airport Cooperative Research Program 2011).

Bioacoustics, or the playing of conspecific distress or predator calls to frighten animals, is widely used. This method relies on the animal's evolutionary danger response (Airport Cooperative Research Program 2011).However, bioacoustics are species-specific and birds may quickly become habituated to them and they should not be used as a primary means of control (U.S. Air Force 2004, Commander, Naval Installations Command 2010).

In 2012, operators at Gloucestershire Airport in the United Kingdom revealed that songs by the American-Swiss singer Tina Turner were more effective than animal noises for scaring birds from its runways.

Tactile repellents
Sharpened spikes to deter perching and loafing are commonly used. Generally, large birds require different applications than small birds do (DeVault et al. 2013).

Chemical repellents
There are only two chemical bird repellents registered for use in the United States. They are methyl anthranilate and anthraquinone. Methyl anthranilate is a primary repellent that produces an immediate unpleasant sensation that is reflexive and does not have to be learned. As such it is most effective for transient populations of birds (DeVault et al. 2013). Methyl anthranilate has been used with great success at rapidly dispersing birds from flight lines at Homestead Air Reserve Station (Engeman et al. 2002). Anthraquinone is a secondary repellent that has a laxative effect that is not instantaneous. Because of this it is most effective on resident populations of wildlife that will have time to learn an aversive response (Izhaki 2002, DeVault et al. 2013).

Relocation
Relocation of raptors from airports is often considered preferable to lethal control methods by both biologists and the public. There are complex legal issues surrounding the capture and relocation of species protected by the Migratory Bird Treaty Act of 1918 and the Bald and Golden Eagle Protection Act of 1940. Prior to capture, proper permits must be obtained and the high mortality rates as well as the risk of disease transmission associated with relocation must be weighed. Between 2008 and 2010, U.S. Department of Agriculture Wildlife Services personnel relocated 606 red-tailed hawks from airports in the United States after the failure of multiple harassment attempts. The return rate of these hawks was 6%; however the relocation mortality rate for these hawks was never determined (DeVault et al. 2013).

Lethal
Lethal wildlife control on airports falls into two categories: reinforcement of other non-lethal methods and population control.

Reinforcement
The premise of effigies, pyrotechnics, and propane exploders is that there be a perceived immediate danger to the species to be dispersed. Initially, the sight of an unnaturally positioned effigy or the sound of pyrotechnics or exploders is enough to elicit a danger response from wildlife. As wildlife become habituated to non-lethal methods the culling of small numbers of wildlife in the presence of conspecifics can restore the danger response (Baxter and Allan 2008, Cook et al. 2008, Commander, Naval Installations Command 2010, DeVault et al. 2013).

Population control
Under certain circumstances, lethal wildlife control is needed to control the population of a species. This control can be localized or regional. Localized population control is often used to control species that are residents of the airfield such as deer that have bypassed the perimeter fence. In this instance sharpshooting would be highly effective, such as is seen at Chicago O'Hare International Airport (DeVault et al. 2013).

Regional population control has been used on species that cannot be excluded from the airport environment. A nesting colony of laughing gulls at Jamaica Bay Wildlife Refuge contributed to 98–315 bird strikes per year, in 1979–1992, at adjacent John F. Kennedy International Airport (JFK). Though JFK had an active bird management program that precluded birds from feeding and loafing on the airport, it did not stop them from overflying the airport to other feeding sites. U.S. Department of Agriculture Wildlife Services personnel began shooting all gulls that flew over the airport, hypothesizing that eventually, the gulls would alter their flight patterns. They shot 28,352 gulls in two years (approximately half of the population at Jamaica Bay and 5–6% of the nationwide population per year). Strikes with laughing gulls decreased by 89% by 1992. However this was more a function of the population reduction than the gulls altering their flight pattern (Dolbeer et al. 1993, Dolbeer et al. 2003, DeVault et al. 2013).

Flight path
Pilots should not take off or land in the presence of wildlife and should avoid migratory routes, wildlife reserves, estuaries and other sites where birds may congregate. When operating in the presence of bird flocks, pilots should seek to climb above  as rapidly as possible as most bird strikes occur below . Additionally, pilots should slow down their aircraft when confronted with birds. Therefore, the speed of the aircraft is much more important than the size of the bird when it comes to reducing energy transfer in a collision. The same can be said for jet engines: the slower the rotation of the engine, the less energy which will be imparted onto the engine at collision.

The body density of the bird is also a parameter that influences the amount of damage caused.

The US Military Avian Hazard Advisory System (AHAS) uses near real-time data from the 148 CONUS based National Weather Service Next Generation Weather Radar (NEXRAD or WSR 88-D) system to provide current bird hazard conditions for published military low-level routes, ranges, and military operating areas (MOAs). Additionally, AHAS incorporates weather forecast data with the Bird Avoidance Model (BAM) to predict soaring bird activity within the next 24 hours and then defaults to the BAM for planning purposes when activity is scheduled outside the 24-hour window. The BAM is a static historical hazard model based on many years of bird distribution data from Christmas Bird Counts (CBC), Breeding Bird Surveys (BBS), and National Wildlife Refuge Data. The BAM also incorporates potentially hazardous bird attractions such as landfills and golf courses. AHAS is now an integral part of military low-level mission planning, aircrew being able to access the current bird hazard conditions at www.usahas.com. AHAS will provide relative risk assessments for the planned mission and give aircrew the opportunity to select a less hazardous route should the planned route be rated severe or moderate. Prior to 2003, the US Air Force BASH Team bird strike database indicated that approximately 25% of all strikes were associated with low-level routes and bombing ranges. More importantly, these strikes accounted for more than 50% of all of the reported damage costs. After a decade of using AHAS for avoiding routes with severe ratings, the strike percentage associated with low-level flight operations has been reduced to 12% and associated costs cut in half.

Avian radar is an important tool for aiding in bird strike mitigation as part of overall safety management systems at civilian and military airfields. Properly designed and equipped avian radars can track thousands of birds simultaneously in real-time, night and day, through 360° of coverage, out to ranges of 10 km and beyond for flocks, updating every target's position (longitude, latitude, altitude), speed, heading, and size every 2–3 seconds. Data from these systems can be used to generate information products ranging from real-time threat alerts to historical analyses of bird activity patterns in both time and space. The United States Federal Aviation Administration (FAA) and the United States Department of Defense (DOD) have conducted extensive science-based field testing and validation of commercial avian radar systems for civil and military applications, respectively. The FAA used evaluations of commercial 3D avian radar systems developed and marketed by Accipiter Radar as the basis for FAA Advisory Circular 150/5220-25 and a guidance letter on using Airport Improvement Program funds to acquire avian radar systems at Part 139 airports. Similarly, the DOD-sponsored Integration and Validation of Avian Radars (IVAR) project evaluated the functional and performance characteristics of Accipiter® avian radars under operational conditions at Navy, Marine Corps, and Air Force airfields. Accipiter avian radar systems operating at Seattle-Tacoma International Airport, Chicago O'Hare International Airport, and Marine Corps Air Station Cherry Point made significant contributions to the evaluations carried out in the aforementioned FAA and DoD initiatives. Additional scientific and technical papers on avian radar systems are listed below,<ref>Nohara, Tim J., et al., "Avian Stakeholder Management of Bird Strike Risks – Enhancing Communication Processes To Pilots and Air Traffic Controllers for Information Derived From Avian Radar] , Summer 2012</ref> and on the Accipiter Radar web site.

A US company, DeTect, in 2003, developed the only production model bird radar in operational use for real-time, tactical bird-aircraft strike avoidance by air traffic controllers. These systems are operational at both commercial airports and military airfields. The system has widely used technology available for bird–aircraft strike hazard (BASH) management and for real-time detection, tracking and alerting of hazardous bird activity at commercial airports, military airfields, and military training and bombing ranges. After extensive evaluation and on-site testing, MERLIN technology was chosen by NASA and was ultimately used for detecting and tracking dangerous vulture activity during the 22 space shuttle launches from 2006 to the conclusion of the program in 2011. The US Air Force has contracted DeTect since 2003 to provide the Avian Hazard Advisory System (AHAS) previously mentioned.

TNO, a Dutch R&D Institute, has developed the successful ROBIN (Radar Observation of Bird Intensity) for the Royal Netherlands Airforce. ROBIN is a near real-time monitoring system for flight movements of birds. ROBIN identifies flocks of birds within the signals of large radar systems. This information is used to give Air Force pilots warning during landing and take-off. Years of observation of bird migration with ROBIN have also provided a better insight into bird migration behavior, which has had an influence on averting collisions with birds, and therefore on flight safety. Since the implementation of the ROBIN system at the Royal Netherlands Airforce the number of collisions between birds and aircraft in the vicinity of military airbases has decreased by more than 50%.

There are no civil aviation counterparts to the above military strategies. Some experimentation with small portable radar units has taken place at some airports. However, no standard has been adopted for radar warning nor has any governmental policy regarding warnings been implemented.

 History 

The Federal Aviation Administration (FAA) estimates bird strikes cost US aviation 400 million dollars annually and have resulted in over 200 worldwide deaths since 1988. In the United Kingdom, the Central Science Laboratory estimates that worldwide, birdstrikes cost airlines around US$1.2 billion annually. This includes repair cost and lost revenue while the damaged aircraft is out of service. There were 4,300 bird strikes listed by the United States Air Force and 5,900 by US civil aircraft in 2003.

The first reported bird strike was by Orville Wright in 1905. According to the Wright Brothers' diaries, "Orville [...] flew 4,751 meters in 4 minutes 45 seconds, four complete circles. Twice passed over the fence into Beard's cornfield. Chased flock of birds for two rounds and killed one which fell on top of the upper surface and after a time fell off when swinging a sharp curve."

During the 1911 Paris to Madrid air race, French pilot Eugene Gilbert encountered an angry mother eagle over the Pyrenees. Gilbert, flying an open-cockpit Bleriot XI, was able to ward off the large bird by firing pistol shots at it but did not kill it.La Domenica del Corriere, cover painting depicting Gilbert's encounter with an eagle, 4 July 1911

The first recorded bird strike fatality was reported in 1912 when aero-pioneer Cal Rodgers collided with a gull which became jammed in his aircraft control cables. He crashed at Long Beach, California, was pinned under the wreckage, and drowned.

During the 1952 edition of the Carrera Panamericana, eventual race winners Karl Kling and Hans Klenk suffered a bird strike incident when the Mercedes-Benz W194 was struck by a vulture in the windscreen. During a long right-hand bend in the opening stage taken at almost , Kling failed to spot vultures sitting by the side of the road. When the vultures were scattered after hearing the virtually unsilenced W194 coming towards them, one vulture impacted through the windscreen on the passenger side. The impact was enough to briefly knock Klenk unconscious. Despite bleeding badly from facial injuries caused by the shattered windscreen, Klenk ordered Kling to maintain speed, and held on until a tire change almost  later to clean himself and the car up. For extra protection, eight vertical steel bars were bolted over the new windscreen. Kling and Klenk also discussed the species and size of the dead bird, agreeing that had had a minimum  wingspan and weighed as much as five fattened geese.

Alan Stacey's fatal accident during the 1960 Belgian Grand Prix was caused when a bird hit him in the face on lap 25, causing his Lotus 18-Climax to crash at the fast, sweeping right hand Burnenville curve. According to fellow driver Innes Ireland's testimony in a mid-1980s edition of Road & Track magazine, Ireland stated that some spectators claimed that a bird had flown into Stacey's face while he was approaching the curve, possibly knocking him unconscious, or even possibly killing him by breaking his neck or inflicting a fatal head injury, before the car crashed.

The greatest loss of life directly linked to a bird strike was on October 4, 1960, when a Lockheed L-188 Electra, flying from Boston as Eastern Air Lines Flight 375, flew through a flock of common starlings during take-off, damaging all four engines. The aircraft crashed into Boston harbor shortly after takeoff, with 62 fatalities out of 72 passengers. Subsequently, minimum bird ingestion standards for jet engines were developed by the FAA.

NASA astronaut Theodore Freeman was killed in 1964 when a goose shattered the plexiglass cockpit canopy of his Northrop T-38 Talon. Shards were ingested by the engines, leading to a fatal crash.

In November 12, 1975, Overseas National Airways Flight 032, the flight crew initiated a rejected takeoff after accelerating through a large flock of gulls at John F. Kennedy International Airport, resulting in a runway excursion. Of the 139 aircraft occupants, all survived, while the aircraft was destroyed by an intense post-crash fire. An investigation was carried out on the #3 engine by General Electric Aircraft Engines (GEAE) in Ohio. Disassembly revealed that several engine fan blades were damaged and broken, causing blades to abrade the epoxy fan shroud; as the epoxy combusted, it ignited jet fuel leaking from a broken fuel line. However, GEAE denied that the ingested birds were the underlying cause of the damage. Company investigators speculated that a tire or landing gear failure had occurred prior to the bird strikes, and that tire, wheel or landing gear debris ingested into the engine caused the fan blade damage and cut the fuel line. To demonstrate that the General Electric CF6 engine was capable of withstanding a bird strike, the National Transportation Safety Board conducted a test with a sample engine.

In 1988, Ethiopian Airlines Flight 604 sucked pigeons into both engines during takeoff and then crashed, killing 35 passengers.

In 1995, a Dassault Falcon 20 crashed at a Paris airport during an emergency landing attempt after sucking lapwings into an engine, which caused an engine failure and a fire in the airplane's fuselage; all 10 people on board were killed.

On September 22, 1995, a U.S. Air Force Boeing E-3 Sentry AWACS aircraft (Callsign Yukla 27, serial number 77-0354), crashed shortly after takeoff from Elmendorf AFB. The aircraft lost power in both port side engines after these engines ingested several Canada geese during takeoff.

On March 30, 1999, during the inaugural run of the hypercoaster Apollo's Chariot in Virginia, passenger Fabio Lanzoni suffered a bird strike by a goose and required three stitches to his face. The roller coaster has a height of over 200 feet and reaches speeds over 70 miles per hour.

On November 28, 2004, the nose landing gear of KLM Flight 1673, a Boeing 737-400, struck a bird during takeoff at Amsterdam Airport Schiphol. The incident was reported to air traffic control, the landing gear was raised normally, and the flight continued normally to its destination. Upon touching down at Barcelona International Airport, the aircraft started deviating to the left of the runway centreline. The crew applied right rudder, braking, and the nose wheel steering tiller but could not keep the aircraft on the runway. After it veered off the paved surface of the runway at about 100 knots, the jet went through an area of soft sand. The nose landing gear leg collapsed and the left main landing gear leg detached from its fittings shortly before the aircraft came to a stop perched over the edge of a drainage canal. All 140 passengers and six crew evacuated safely, but the aircraft itself had to be written off. The cause was discovered to be a broken cable in the nose wheel steering system caused by the bird collision. Contributing to the snapped cable was the improper application of grease during routine maintenance which led to severe wear of the cable.

In April 2007, a Thomsonfly Boeing 757 from Manchester Airport to Lanzarote Airport suffered a bird strike when at least one bird, supposedly a crow, was ingested by the starboard engine. The plane landed safely back at Manchester Airport a while later. The incident was captured by two plane spotters on opposite sides of the airport, as well as the emergency calls picked up by a plane spotter's radio.

The Space Shuttle Discovery also hit a bird (a vulture) during the launch of STS-114 on July 26, 2005, although the collision occurred soon after lift-off and at low speed, with no obvious damage to the shuttle.

On November 10, 2008, Ryanair Flight 4102 from Frankfurt to Rome made an emergency landing at Ciampino Airport after multiple bird strikes caused both engines to fail. After touchdown, the left main landing gear collapsed, and the aircraft briefly veered off the runway. Passengers and crew were evacuated through the starboard emergency exits.

On January 4, 2009, a Sikorsky S-76 helicopter hit a red-tailed hawk in Louisiana. The hawk hit the helicopter just above the windscreen. The impact forced the activation of the engine fire suppression control handles, retarding the throttles and causing the engines to lose power. Eight of the nine people on board died in the subsequent crash; the survivor, a passenger, was seriously injured.

On January 15, 2009, US Airways Flight 1549 from LaGuardia Airport to Charlotte/Douglas International Airport ditched into the Hudson River after experiencing a loss of both turbines. All 150 passengers and 5 crew members were safely evacuated after a successful water landing. On May 28, 2010, the NTSB published its final report into the accident.

On August 15, 2019, Ural Airlines Flight 178 from Moscow–Zhukovsky to Simferopol, Crimea, suffered a bird strike after taking off from Zhukovsky and crash landed in a cornfield 5 kilometers away from the airport. 74 people were injured, all with minor injuries.

Bug strikes
Flying insect strikes, like bird strikes, have been encountered by pilots since aircraft were invented. Future United States Air Force general Henry H. Arnold, as a young officer, nearly lost control of his Wright Model B in 1911 after a bug flew into his eye while he was not wearing goggles, distracting him.

In 1968, North Central Airlines Flight 261, a Convair 580, encountered large concentrations of insects between Chicago and Milwaukee. The accumulated insect remains on the windshield severely impaired the flightcrew's forward visibility; as a result, while descending to land at Milwaukee, the aircraft suffered a mid-air collision with a private Cessna 150 that the Convair's flightcrew had been unable to see until a split second before the collision, killing the three occupants of the Cessna and severely injuring the Convair's first officer.

In 1986, a Boeing B-52 Stratofortress on a low-level training mission entered a swarm of locusts. The insects' impacts on the aircraft's windscreens rendered the crew unable to see, forcing them to abort the mission and fly using the aircraft's instruments alone. The aircraft eventually landed safely.

In 2010, the Australian Civil Aviation Safety Authority (CASA) issued a warning to pilots about the potential dangers of flying through a locust swarm. CASA warned that the insects could cause loss of engine power and loss of visibility, and blocking of an aircraft's pitot tubes, causing inaccurate airspeed readings.

Bug strikes can also affect the operation of machinery on the ground, especially motorcycles. The team on the US TV show MythBusters – in a 2010 episode entitled "Bug Special" – concluded that death could occur if a motorist were hit by a flying insect of sufficient mass in a vulnerable part of the body. Anecdotal evidence from motorcyclists supports pain, bruising, soreness, stings, and forced dismount caused by collision with an insect at speed.

In popular culture
 In the March 1942 Boy's Own Paper story Biggles and the Purple Plague, by Capt. W. E. Johns, an immense swarm of locusts threatens food supplies, and the aviators have trouble flying.
 An episode of the classic Jonny Quest animated TV show features a giant condor ripping the wing off of a Fokker D.VII World War One fighter plane.
 In the 1965 film Sands of the Kalahari, a twin-engine plane is brought down by a locust swarm that smears the windscreen and clogs the carburetor intakes.
 In the 1989 film Indiana Jones and the Last Crusade, Henry Jones Sr. (Sean Connery) uses an umbrella to scare a flock of birds into the path of an attacking Luftwaffe fighter plane, causing it to sustain multiple bird strikes and crash, saving his life and the life of his son, Indiana Jones (Harrison Ford).
 In the 1997 film The Edge, starring Anthony Hopkins and Alec Baldwin, their floatplane crashes after encountering bird strike, leaving the two stranded in the wilderness with their friend.
 The 2016 film Sully shows US Airways Flight 1549 captained by Chesley Sullenberger that was forced to ditch on the Hudson River in 2009 after sustaining a bird strike shortly after takeoff from LaGuardia Airport.
 In the 2022 film Top Gun: Maverick Phoenix and Bob are forced to eject after a bird strike causes the engines of their F/A-18F to flame out.

See also

 AEDC Ballistic Range S-3
 Carla Dove—ornithologist and researcher specializing in bird strikes
 Chicken gun
 Foreign object damage
 Mid-air collision – an aerial collision between aircraft
 Roxie Collie Laybourne
 Stray animals at Indian airports

References

External links

 Wildlife Hazard Mitigation – Federal Aviation Administration
 Avian Hazard Advisory System
 Australian Aviation Wildlife Hazard Group
 Bird Strike Committee USA
 
 
 International Bird Strike Committee
 Bomben, Andrea. 2022. Wildlife strike. A guide for airline pilot. IBN Editore. Roma. Italy. 
 Bomben, Andrea. 2022. Wildlife Strike Handbook (WSH). First edition''.[https://www.dropbox.com/s/b6v6csd0ebxeadv/APPENDIX%20L%20-%20WSH%20%28Wildlife%20Strike%20Handbook%29.%20First%20edition..pdf?dl=0
 World Birdstrike Association. 

Aviation risks
Strike
Strike
Bird attacks